Brindaban Govt. College, Habiganj is a public, honors-level degree college in the town of Habiganj, Bangladesh. It was established in 1931.

The college is situated in Habiganj Sadar. Having an area of 18 bigha, it is the largest college of in Habiganj.

History 
To create higher education opportunity in Habiganj region, Brindaban Dash set up the college. Local people also came forward to help him.

Academics 
More than 4,000 students in Higher Secondary School Certificate (HSC), honors and masters levels are currently studying in this college. The HSC education is controlled by the Board of Intermediate and Secondary Education, Sylhet. Honors and masters subjects are taught according to the guidance of Bangladesh National University.

The college placed within the top ten colleges in Sylhet Division, and it is The top ranked college in Habiganj district. according to student performance, in four years between 2007 and 2016.

Campus 
Having an area of 6.2 acre, the college campus is adorned with academic buildings, tree orchards, ponds and other infrastructures. There are a number of magnificent buildings in the college. These buildings are as old as the college itself. A library, Shaheed Minar commemorating the martyrs of language movement in 1952, a mosque, and a gymnasium are also in the campus.

Notable alumni
 Enamul Hoque Mostofa Shaheed was a six-term Member of Parliament and Minister of Social Welfare.

References

Colleges in Habiganj District
1931 establishments in India
Educational institutions established in 1931